Farz aur Kaanoon is a 1982 Indian Hindi-language action film, produced by M. Arjuna Raju and A. S. R. Anjineelu under the Roja Movies banner and directed by K. Raghavendra Rao. It stars Jeetendra, Hema Malini, Rati Agnihotri in the pivotal roles and music composed by Laxmikant–Pyarelal. The film is a remake of producer -director duo's own Telugu movie Kondaveeti Simham (1981) starring N. T. Rama Rao, Sridevi which itself was a remake of the 1974 Tamil movie Thanga Pathakkam, which incidentally went on to inspire another Hindi movie in 1982 itself – Shakti.

The film was recorded a "Super Hit" at the box office.

Plot
For Inspector Ranjit Kumar, fulfilling his duty and protecting the law are the only aims of his life, he and Bharti are paired as Ram and Sita of the present age. Their happiness had no bounds when Bharti was admitted into the hospital for her first delivery. Soon it changed to sadness after Bharti's father informed them that the child was stillborn. The sad days then bloomed out to happiness. And within a year, Bharti gave birth to a child Ravi. They forgot the grief of their first child's loss and together looked forward to the upbringing of Ravi. They have the intention of making him an honest and big personality. But Ravi from the very beginning had fallen into bad company. From childhood itself, he started smoking cigarettes - playing cards - robbing things etc. Due to these bad habits, Ravi was admitted to a hostel from where he later ran away. Being a police Inspector, Ranjit Kumar finds out Ravi, but he hides this secret from Bharti. She wept over the loss of her son. But then too, Ranjit Kumar kept Ravi away from her motherhood in the hope that one day Ravi would overcome his bad habits.

Ranjit Kumar's first son, whom Bharti's father had handed over to a maid-servant Ganga so that Bharti's marriage could not get disturbed, now had grown to a youth in a village and his name is Ramu. Ramu comes to the town - he saves Major Gopal's daughter - Poonam twice from the road Romeos and because of Major Gopal, he comes in contact with Ranjit and Bharti, his parents. Ravi also grew up and returned home, he blamed Ranjit Kumar for all the calamities that he had to face. On one side, Ranjit was on his mission to finish off those people who were working against his country and on the other hand, Ravi joined them and started creating problems for Ranjit. Even though Bharti loved Ravi, Ravi loved the unlawful life, whereas Ranjit Kumar loved his duty and law. Everyone's thoughts differed, so how could they stay under one roof? On this, Ravi left his house. And of this grief, Bharti had a paralysis attack. Bharti had become weak due to the separation of Ravi, at her last moment Ganga the maidservant comes out with the secret of Ramu being her elder son. Bharti was glad, but her time was just near to completion. Before her last breath, she took the promise from Ramu that he must break down the wall that stood between his younger brother Ravi and his father. How does Ramu fulfill his mother's last wish? How does he bring back Ravi from amongst the bad man? How does he put Ranjit Kumar and Ravi together?

Cast
Jeetendra as S.P. Ranjit Kumar / Ramu (Dual Role)
Hema Malini as Bharati
Rati Agnihotri as Poonam
Raj Kiran as Ravi
Kader Khan as Naagraj
Asrani as Sitapati
Prem Chopra as Major Gopal
Shakti Kapoor
Bharat Bhushan
Sharat Saxena
Geetha as Padma

Soundtrack
Lyrics: Anand Bakshi

References

External links

1980s Hindi-language films
Hindi remakes of Telugu films
Films directed by K. Raghavendra Rao
Films scored by Laxmikant–Pyarelal
Fictional portrayals of the Maharashtra Police